John Goddard may refer to:

John Goddard (engraver) (fl. 1645–1671), engraver
John Goddard (cricketer) (1919–1987), West Indian cricketer
Johnathan Goddard (1981–2008), American football player
John Goddard (adventurer) (1924–2013), American adventurer, explorer and lecturer
John Goddard (bishop) (born 1947), Bishop of Burnley
John Frederick Goddard (1795–1866), English chemist
John Theodore Goddard, solicitor appointed by Wallis Simpson as an adviser during her divorce proceedings
John Goddard (footballer), English footballer currently playing for St Albans City

See also
Jon Goddard (born 1982), English rugby player
John Godard